Brendan Whittet (born March 22, 1971) is an American ice hockey coach who has been the head coach at Brown since 2009. Whittet graduated from Brown in 1994 before embarking on a coaching career at several colleges in New England. After 14 years as an assistant Whittet returned to his alma mater to assume the reins in 2009–10, a position he still holds. He lives in Barrington, Rhode Island with his family.

Career statistics

Head coaching record

References

External links
 Official biography, Brown Bears

1971 births
American ice hockey coaches
American men's ice hockey defensemen
Brown Bears men's ice hockey coaches
Brown Bears men's ice hockey players
Ice hockey coaches from Rhode Island
Living people
People from East Providence, Rhode Island
Ice hockey players from Rhode Island